Max Edler von Poosch-Gablenz (1872–1968) was an Austrian painter and a war artist during the First World War (1914–18). His Kampfstaffel D3, über der Brenta-Gruppe (Squadron over the Brenta) from 1917, and now in the Heeresgeschichtliches Museum, "can be seen as the archetype of aviation painting as it proliferated all over Europe" during and after the war. It gives a strong illusion of height, but is excessive in its attention to detail.

References

Further reading
Viktor Trautzl. Max von Poosch, Leben und Werk. Verlag Das Bergland-Buch, 1958.

1872 births
1968 deaths
Austrian war artists
19th-century Austrian painters
19th-century Austrian male artists
Austrian male painters
20th-century Austrian painters
Edlers of Austria
World War I artists
20th-century Austrian male artists